"Oh What a Dream" is a 1954 blues song written by Chuck Willis and originally performed by Ruth Brown backed by members of The Drifters (only credited as her Rhythmakers). The single was Brown's fourth number one on the U.S. R&B chart.

Song Background
The song has been described as a torch song with a gospel tint, adding up to a big dose of that R&B balladeering as expressed in the lyrics and Brown's soulful performance:
"Dreamed I held you in my arms
But I'm still waiting for that day to come
Ohh what a dream, what a dream I had last night"

Cover versions
 Patti Page had an August 1954 single release of the song - as "What a Dream" - which reached #10 pop.
 In 1960, Conway Twitty had a minor pop hit with his version of the song.

References
 

1954 singles
Ruth Brown songs
Conway Twitty songs
Songs written by Chuck Willis
Atlantic Records singles